Nicolae Ciubuc (born 13 December 1980) is a Moldovan politician. He served as Minister of Agriculture, Regional Development and Environment from 25 September 2018 to 8 June 2019. Georgeta Mincu was appointed as his successor.

He previously served as director of the Intervention and Payment Agency for Agriculture.

References 

Living people
Year of birth missing (living people)
Place of birth missing (living people)
21st-century Moldovan politicians